Hrafna-Flóki Vilgerðarsson (born 9th century) was the first Norseman to intentionally sail to Iceland. His story is documented in the Landnámabók manuscript; however, the precise year of his arrival is not clear. He settled in this new land then known as Garðarshólmi.

Voyage to Iceland
In 868, Flóki left to search for the land found by Garðar Svavarsson way up in the north. He was accompanied by his family on his journey; his wife was named Gró and his children included Oddleifur and Þjóðgerður. From Western Norway he set sail to the Shetland Islands where it is said his daughter drowned. He continued his journey and landed in the Faroe Islands where another of his daughters was wed. There he took three ravens to help him find his way to Iceland, and thus, he was nicknamed Raven-Flóki (Old Norse and ) and he is commonly remembered by that name.

Others making the trip included Thorolf (Þórólfr) and two men named Herjolf and Faxe ( and ). After sailing for a while from the Faroes, Flóki set the ravens free. The first raven flew back to the Faroes; later, the second flew up in the air and back on board, but the third flew northwest and did not return. Flóki now knew they were close to land, and so they followed the third raven. After sailing west past Reykjanes, they spotted a large bay. Faxe remarked that they seemed to have found great land. The bay facing Reykjavík was therefore known as Faxaflói.

Flóki set up a winter camp in Vatnsfjörður at Barðaströnd. The summer was very good, so Flóki was ill-prepared for the cold winter that followed. Waiting for the spring, Flóki hiked up the highest mountain above his camp, now believed to be Nónfell in Westfjords. From there, he spotted a large fjord; Ísafjörður, then full of drift ice. Thus, he named the entire land  (Iceland). When Flóki and the other men returned to Norway, they were asked about the newly found land. Flóki believed it to be worthless. Herjolf believed that the land had both good and bad qualities. Thorolf claimed that butter was smeared on every straw on the land that they had found. Thorolf was then nicknamed Thorolf Butter. Despite speaking ill of the land, Flóki later returned and settled to live there to his death.

In fiction 
Floki the boat builder, a character played by Swedish actor Gustaf Skarsgård in the History channel's Vikings television series, is loosely based on Hrafna-Flóki Vilgerðarson. In season 5 of the show he arrives in Iceland, believing he has found Asgard.

See also
 Settlement of Iceland
 Timeline of Icelandic history
 Naddoddur — the first Scandinavian to discover Iceland, though accidental
 Garðar Svavarsson — second, also accidental

References

Sources

Further reading
Byock, Jesse (1988) Medieval Iceland: Society, Sagas and Power (University of California Press) 
Byock, Jesse (2001) Viking Age Iceland (Penguin Books) 
Hjalmarsson, Jon R. (1993) History of Iceland - From Settlement to the Present Day (Reykjavík: Iceland Review ) 
Jones, Gwyn  (1986) The Norse Atlantic Saga: Being the Norse Voyages of Discovery and Settlement to Iceland, Greenland, and North America (Oxford University Press) 
Karlsson, Gunnar (2000) The History of Iceland  (University of Minnesota Press) 

Viking explorers
Hrafna-Floki Vilgerdarson
9th-century Vikings